The Anglo-Saxon Poetic Records (ASPR) is a six-volume edition intended at the time of its publication to encompass all known Old English poetry. Despite many subsequent editions of individual poems or collections, it has remained the standard reference work for scholarship in this field.

History

The edition was conceived by George Philip Krapp (1872–1934), who edited volumes 1, 2, and 5 while Professor of English at Columbia University, with the assistance of his student and colleague Elliott Van Kirk Dobbie. Krapp died partway through editing volume 3, and Dobbie completed this edition before going on to complete the series by editing volumes 6 (which came out in 1942) and 4 (which emerged in 1953). According to Henry Wiggins, the long gap before the publication of Volume 4 was partly due

to Elliott's feeling that there was no urgency about completing the Beowulf volume, because there were so many competent editions. The Press, like any publisher, was troubled about the absence of Volume V [recte Volume IV] from a six-volume set, and I was assigned the duty of "prodding" Elliott. Despite all my efforts, he gave us the manuscript when he wanted to—when he felt he had something to contribute.

In 1960, the ASPR became the basis for Bessinger's A Short Dictionary of Anglo-Saxon Poetry. A concordance to the ASPR was published in 1978.

The Old English texts in the ASPR were digitised by Greg Hidley under the auspices of the Toronto Dictionary of Old English project; this text was then corrected by Duncan Macrae-Gibson, though still with a few divergences from the ASPR text.

Contents 

Scholars waver, when citing the ASPR, over whether they regard it as six works in a numbered series or as a single work in six volumes.

As six individual works, the ASPR comprises:

 .
 .
 .
 .
 .
 .

As a single work, it is thought of as:

 .

The series was printed in the UK by Routledge and Kegan Paul, but the UK year of publication is not always clear, leading to some variation in citations. The series was reprinted by Columbia University Press in 1961.

External links
 Anglo-Saxon Poetic Records at University of Oxford Text Archive

References

Old English literature